Director's Cut is second studio album from the Norwegian band Helldorado.

Track listing
All songs by Dag S. Vagle, except "Payrolled", "I´d Waited for This Day" - music by Vagle, lyrics by Martin Hagfors, and "Diesel and Bones" - music by Vagle, lyrics by Vagle & Hagfors.

 "Blood Shack" - 4:33
 "Lucy and Mary" - 5:32
 "Payrolled" - 3:24
 "Diesel and Bones" - 3:52
 "The Snake Girl Song" - 3:13
 "Dead River" - 5:33
 "I´d Waited for This Day" - 5:08
 "Killer on the Highway" - 3:20
 "Teenage Queen" - 4:16
 "Woman Shouldn´t Drink" - 2:35
 "Roadhouse" - 5:35
 "Surfin' Transylvania" (bonus track) - 2:17

Personnel

Helldorado
Dag S. Vagle: Vocals, Guitar, Banjo, Bouzouki, Organ
Bård Halsne: Guitar, Space Echo, Backing Vocals
Hans A. Wassvik: Bass guitar, Pedal Bass
Morten Jackman: Drums, Saw, Percussion

Guest musicians
Rune Helland - Pedal Steel (1,6,8)
Pete Johansen - Fiddle (7)
Ry Krueger - Slide Guitar (11)
Anne Mae H. Vagle - Backing Vocals (1,2,8)
Marianne Albert - Backing Vocals (2)
Martin Hagfors - Backing Vocals (7)
Angeli Kvartetten - Strings (2,6)
Johan Egdetveit - String arrangement (2)
Bengt Olav Hansen - String arrangement (6)

References

External links
 Helldorado Official Site 

Helldorado (band) albums
2005 albums